Girardin is a family-owned brewery in Sint-Ulriks-Kapelle, Belgium.  The brewery was founded in 1845 and has been owned and operated by the Girardin family since 1882. The brewery specializes in lambic beers.

References

External links
 Official Website
 Website

Companies established in 1845
Belgian brands
Breweries of Flanders
Companies based in Flemish Brabant
Dilbeek